Nicole Schaller (born 10 May 1993) is a badminton player from Switzerland. In 2011, she won Welsh International tournament.

See also
Swiss Open (badminton)

References

Swiss female badminton players
Living people
1993 births
21st-century Swiss women